Nicolás Pelaitay (born 27 December 1992) is an Argentine professional footballer who plays as a midfielder for Primera Nacional side Estudiantes de Buenos Aires.

Career
San Martín signed Pelaitay in 2009. His senior career with them got underway in early 2013, when he was an unused substitute for Argentine Primera División fixtures with Racing Club and Unión Santa Fe. In May 2013, Pelaitay made his professional bow during a 2–1 win versus Argentinos Juniors. In the following campaign of 2013–14, in Primera B Nacional following relegation, Pelaitay netted his first goal in an away defeat to Unión Santa Fe on 24 March 2014. In his opening six seasons with San Martín, he scored twice in sixty-five matches in all competitions. 

At the end of July 2021, Pelaitay moved to Primera Nacional side Estudiantes de Buenos Aires, signing a deal until the end of 2022.

Career statistics
.

References

External links

1992 births
Living people
Sportspeople from San Juan Province, Argentina
Argentine footballers
Association football midfielders
Argentine Primera División players
Primera Nacional players
San Martín de San Juan footballers
Estudiantes de Buenos Aires footballers